Vilma Peña (born 28 March 1960) is a Costa Rican long-distance runner. She competed in the women's marathon at the 1992 Summer Olympics.

References

1960 births
Living people
Athletes (track and field) at the 1991 Pan American Games
Pan American Games competitors for Costa Rica
Athletes (track and field) at the 1992 Summer Olympics
Costa Rican female long-distance runners
Costa Rican female marathon runners
Olympic athletes of Costa Rica
Competitors at the 1990 Central American and Caribbean Games
Central American and Caribbean Games bronze medalists for Costa Rica
World Athletics Championships athletes for Costa Rica
People from Cartago Province
Central American Games gold medalists for Costa Rica
Central American Games medalists in athletics
Central American Games silver medalists for Costa Rica
Central American and Caribbean Games medalists in athletics
20th-century Costa Rican women
21st-century Costa Rican women